Chairmen of the People's Assembly of Karachay–Cherkessia. It was preceded by the Supreme Soviet.

Chairmen of the Supreme Soviet

Chairmen of the People's Assembly of Karachay–Cherkessia

References 

Politics of Karachay-Cherkessia
Lists of legislative speakers in Russia